The 2008 PBA All-Star Weekend was the annual all-star weekend of the Philippine Basketball Association (PBA)'s 2007–08 PBA season. The events were held from April 24 to 27, 2008 at the West Negros University Gym, Bacolod, Negros Occidental.

Friday events

Obstacle Challenge
Time in seconds.

Willie Miller wins for the third straight year, with the fastest time in the event's history.

Three-point shootout

Slam Dunk competition

Failed to qualify: Reynel Hugnatan, Ronald Tubid, Joey Mente

Rookie-Sophomore Blitz Game

Rosters

Rookies:
Yousif Aljamal (Talk 'N Text)
Ken Bono (Magnolia)
Ronjay Buenafe (Coca-Cola)
Marvin Cruz (Air21)
Joe Devance (Welcoat)
Samigue Eman (Magnolia)
Doug Kramer (Air21)
Chico Lanete (Purefoods)
Coach: Cholo Martin (Sta. Lucia)

Sophomores:
Mark Andaya (Red Bull)
Junjun Cabatu (Alaska)
Jireh Ibañes (Welcoat)
Mark Isip (Welcoat)
Magnum Membrere (Red Bull)
Chris Pacana (Brgy. Ginebra)
Jay-R Reyes (Welcoat)
LA Tenorio (Alaska)
Coach: Koy Banal (Purefoods)

Game

In the game, there were four 10-minute quarters, the 8-second rule was lessened into 6 seconds, the shot clock was cut into 18 seconds, and a slam dunk was counted for three points.

Sunday events

Legends Shootout

All-Star Game

Rosters

North All-Stars:
Mark Caguioa (Brgy. Ginebra)
Jayjay Helterbrand (Brgy. Ginebra)
Marc Pingris (Magnolia)
Lordy Tugade (Magnolia)
Kerby Raymundo (Purefoods)
Nic Belasco (Coca-Cola)
Mark Cardona (Talk 'N Text)
Ranidel de Ocampo (Air21)
Willie Miller (Alaska)
Arwind Santos (Air21)
Enrico Villanueva (Purefoods)
Ryan Reyes (Sta. Lucia)
Coach: Ryan Gregorio (Purefoods)

South All-Stars:
Asi Taulava (Coca-Cola)
Jimmy Alapag (Talk 'N Text)
Cyrus Baguio (Red Bull)
John Ferriols (Alaska)
Dondon Hontiveros (Magnolia)
Reynel Hugnatan (Alaska)
Peter June Simon (Purefoods)
Sonny Thoss (Alaska)
Junthy Valenzuela (Brgy. Ginebra)
Kelly Williams (Sta. Lucia)
James Yap (Purefoods)
Reynel Hugnatan (Alaska)
Coach: Boyet Fernandez (Sta. Lucia)

Game

References

All-Star Weekend
Philippine Basketball Association All-Star Weekend
Sports in Negros Occidental